Steven-Elliot Altman is an American author, graphic novelist, video game writer-director, producer, screenwriter and the current Chief Executive Officer of a software company called Social Impulse that services the videogame industry.

Novels
Captain America is dead. (1992) (Jabberwocky Press)
The Flyswatter Agenda
Zen in the art of Slaying Vampires (1997) (Hell's Kitchen Books)
The Touch: Epidemic of the Millennium (an anthology) (2000)(Simon & Schuster)
Tao Damphire (Referenced. No Publication Data Found)
Deprivers (2003) (Bestseller) (Ace/Penguin Putnam)
Fear Itself (Batman novel) (with Michael Reaves) (2007) (DC Comics / Del Rey)
Infinite Mirror (Batman novel) (with Michael Reaves) (Sequestered) (DC Comics / Del Rey)
The Killswitch Review (with Diane Dekelb-Rittenhouse) (2009) (Yard Dog Press) (2011-2012) (Serialized on SuicideGirls.com)
Severed Wings (2020) (WordFire Press)

Video games
9Dragons Online (Published 2007) (Massively Multiple Online Roleplaying Game) (Written By / Game Director)(Acclaim Games) 
2Moons (Published 2008) (Massively Multiple Online Roleplaying Game) (Game Director) (Acclaim Games)
Mafia Payoff (Published 2009) (Facebook Game) (Written By) (Acclaim Games) 
My Diva Doll (Published 2009) (PC Game) (Executive Oversight) (Acclaim Games) 
Ponystars (Published 2009) (PC Game) (Executive Oversight) (Acclaim Games)
Tribal Nations (Published 2009) (PC Game) (Executive Oversight) (Acclaim Games)
RockFREE (Published 2010) (Facebook Game) (Executive Oversight) (Acclaim Games)
Prize Potato (Published 2010) (Facebook Game) (Executive Oversight) (Acclaim Games)
Entropia Universe (Published 2012) (massively multiplayer online virtual universe) (Affiliate Program Designer) (MindArk) 
Pearl's Peril (Published 2013) (Episodic Hidden Object Adventure Game, Facebook, iPhone and iPad) (Written By / Narrative Designer) (Wooga) 
Phrazzle (Published 2013) (Puzzle Game, Facebook, iPhone and iPad) (Producer) (GameFly)
Ancient Aliens (Published 2016) (Facebook, Android, iPhone, iPad) (Producer / Written By / Narrative Designer) (The History Channel / 5th Column Games)
Terminator: Dark Fate (Published 2019) (Android, Tablet, iPhone, iPad) (Game Story By) (Firefly Games / Skydance Media)
Project Blue Book (Published 2020) (Android, Tablet, iPhone, iPad) (Producer / Written By / Narrative Designer) (The History Channel / Three Gates)

Graphic novels
The Irregulars (with Michael Reaves) (2005) (Dark Horse)
Catholic Schoolgirls of the Apocalypse (with Tricia Riley Hale)
Joust

Short stories
"A Blind Virgin Like A Loaded Gun" (2000) (From the anthology The Touch, Simon & Schuster)
"Reach Out And Touch Someone" (2001)
"A Case of Royal Blood" (2003) (From the Hugo Award Winning anthology Shadows Over Baker Street, Del Rey Books)
"Even a Broken Clock" (2004) (From the anthology Blondes In Trouble)
"Suffer Not a Witch to Live in Kansas" (2011) (From the anthology I Should Have Stayed in Oz, Yard Dog Press)

Screenplays
Deprivers
Director: Andy Wolk
Production Co: Mandalay Pictures
Studio: Columbia TriStar
Zen in the Art of Slaying Vampires
Director: Russell Mulcahy
Production Co: Capitol Films and Unity Films

Videogame field
An avid gamer and award-winning writer, Altman was mentored in social game metrics by industry rock star David Perry. Altman’s first game writing assignment was reportedly in 1996, writing the CD Rom DC Universe for Judson Rosebush (Visual FX Master of Tron) in a seedy back room of Carnegie Hall. Altman was later enticed to join Acclaim Games by former Activision co-Founder and Chairman Howard Marks, initially as the writer for the game 9Dragons and later as Game Director/Director of Marketing. After assessing Altman’s business acumen and marketing experience, Marks gave Altman full directorial control of Acclaim’s download division. Altman also wrote Facebook social games for Acclaim, including Mafia Payoff, and oversaw the hiring, training and content of all writers on all games, including Ponystars, MyDivaDoll and Tribal Nations, while managing staff in multiple global offices. In May 2010, Acclaim was purchased by Playdom, the fourth largest Social Game company, which in turn was acquired by Disney. Altman was offered the opportunity to come on board with Playdom, but declined in lieu of the offer to become an advisory board member of a software company called Manumatix to help develop the popular Bamboo software platform for the branded entertainment space, and eventually found Socialtype LLC, and transform Bamboo to serve the videogame space. Altman has also served as the Vice-Chairman elect of the steering committee of the Videogame Division of the Writers Guild of America since 2008, and has served as a Finalist Judge for their Video Game Awards since 2009. In 2013, Altman wrote and narrative designed the popular Facebook/IOS story-driven Hidden Object game Pearl's Peril for Berlin-based Wooga, currently the fifth biggest video game producer.

Authorial field
Altman is a bestselling Science Fiction author, an outlet that he self-proclaims, "allows him to infuse his passion for technology into envisioning how social networks will transform the society of tomorrow". Altman’s novels include Captain America is Dead, Zen in the Art of Slaying Vampires, Batman: Fear Itself, The Killswitch Review, The Irregulars and Deprivers. His writing has inspired illustrations and cover art from artists such as Edward Gorey, John Jude Palencar and Ben Templesmith.

Honors and awards
Bestseller List for Deprivers (Novel) - Author
Active member of the Writers Guild of America
Active member of the Writers Guild of Canada
Active member of the Science Fiction and Fantasy Writers of America
Active member of the Horror Writers Association
MMOsite Reader's Choice Awards for 9Dragons - Best Storyline, Best New Game, Best PVP
Centers for Disease Control and Prevention Game On! Mobile Application Video Game Challenge - Finalist Judge (2014)
Nominated for a Develop Award for Pearl's Peril - Best Use of Narrative in a Game (2014)

References

Living people
20th-century American novelists
20th-century American male writers
21st-century American novelists
American comics writers
American male novelists
American horror writers
American male screenwriters
American science fiction writers
American male short story writers
20th-century American short story writers
21st-century American short story writers
21st-century American male writers
Year of birth missing (living people)